The Dunedin Central by-election of 1915 was a by-election during the 19th New Zealand Parliament held on 3 February in the Dunedin Central electorate. The by-election was sparked by the resignation of the incumbent, Charles Statham, after irregularities in the counting of the vote during the 1914 general election turned a 10-vote lead for his competitor Jim Munro into a 12-vote loss. There were only two nominees.

Background
On election night 1914 Jim Munro had a provisional lead of one vote in Dunedin Central. Due to the closeness of the polling there were several re-counts of the ballots which took many days. To general surprise the final magisterial re-count resulted in the seat being awarded to Charles Statham by a 12 vote margin. It was soon revealed however that this was due to a "careless" polling clerk scribbling notes and numbers on ballot papers (rather than counterfoil). All affected ballot papers just happened to be votes for Munro and were thus declared void. If included the 22 disqualified votes would have resulted in a 10 vote final victory for Munro.

Under the circumstances Statham felt honour bound to resign the seat, though he was in no way obligated to do so. He did and thereby triggered a by-election. The Reform government had a bare minimum majority and therefore much was at stake. As a result the Liberal Party did not contest the election and its leader Sir Joseph Ward actively toured the electorate to encourage the electors to vote for Munro. In the event of a Labour victory it was conceivable for Ward to form a minority government with Labour support.

Results
The following table gives the election results:

Results by locality
Following table showcases the detailed results by locality by ballot location:

Aftermath
As a result of Statham's victory, the government retained its scant 41:39 majority, allowing them to continue in office. At the next general election in 1919 Statham once again defeated Munro. Statham was to remain MP for Dunedin Central until he retired at the 1935 general election. Munro won election to Parliament at another by-election in 1922 for the neighboring seat of Dunedin North.

Notes

References

Dunedin Central 1915
1915 elections in New Zealand
Politics of Dunedin
1910s in Dunedin